Engineers use reflection lines to judge a surface's quality. Reflection lines reveal surface flaws, particularly discontinuities in normals indicating that the surface is not . Reflection lines may be created and examined on physical surfaces or virtual surfaces with the help of computer graphics. For example, the shiny surface of an automobile body is illuminated with reflection lines by surrounding the car with parallel light sources. Virtually, a surface can be rendered with reflection lines by modulating the surfaces point-wise color according to a simple calculation involving the surface normal, viewing direction and a square wave environment map.

Mathematical definition 

Consider a point   on a surface  with (possibly non-unit length) normal . If an observer views this point from infinity at an incoming direction  then the reflected view direction  is:

For reflection lines we consider repeated infinite, non-dispersive light sources parallel to some line  and therefore perpendicular to a plane . Define the vector  to be the reflection direction  projected onto the plane :

and similarly let  be the unit viewing direction projected onto :

where  is the atan2 function producing a number in the range .

Finally, to render the reflection lines positive values  are mapped to a light color and non-positive values to a dark color.

Highlight lines 

Highlight lines are a view-independent alternative to reflection lines. Here the projected normal is directly compared against some arbitrary vector  perpendicular to the light source:

where  is the surface normal projected on the light source plane :

The relationship between reflection lines and  highlight lines is likened to that between specular and diffuse shading.

References 

Computer graphics
Differential geometry